Sam Querrey was the defending champion but was eliminated by James Ward in the third round, ensuring that, for the sixth straight year, the defending champion would not be able to defend his title.

Andy Murray won in the final 3–6, 7–6(7–2), 6–4 against Jo-Wilfried Tsonga.

Seeds
The top eight seeds receive a bye into the second round.

Qualifying

Draw

Final

Top half

Section 1

Section 2

Bottom half

Section 3

Section 4

References
Main Draw

2011 Aegon Championships